A Gun Fightin' Gentleman is a 1919 American Western film directed by John Ford and starring Harry Carey. Because only three reels of originally five or six are known to exist, this film is considered a partially lost film.

Plot
As described in a film magazine, ranch owner Cheyenne Harry (Carey) is the victim of a plot engineered by land speculator John Merritt (Sherry), who uses a doctored title to deprive Harry of his land holdings. Powerless in the face of his opponent's superior knowledge of the law, Harry is forced to retaliate by appropriating Merritt's payroll. Later he abducts Merritt's daughter Helen (O'Connor) and holds her pending settlement of their dispute. A settlement is effected in due time, but not before Harry has won the heart of the young woman.

Cast
 Harry Carey as Cheyenne Harry
 J. Barney Sherry as John Merritt
 Kathleen O'Connor as Helen Merritt
 Harry von Meter as Earl of Jollywell (credited as Harry V. Meter)
 Lydia Yeamans Titus as Helen's Aunt (credited as Lydia Titus)
 Duke R. Lee as Buck Regan
 Joe Harris as Seymour
 John Cook as Old Sheriff (credited as Johnnie Cooke)
 Ted Brooks as The 'Youngster'

See also
 Harry Carey filmography
 List of incomplete or partially lost films

References

External links
 

1919 films
1919 Western (genre) films
American black-and-white films
Films directed by John Ford
Universal Pictures films
Silent American Western (genre) films
1910s American films
1910s English-language films